Standard Oil of Louisiana  of Shreveport, Louisiana was created in 1909 as a subsidiary of Standard Oil of New Jersey (Esso, now part of ExxonMobil), a part of the Standard Oil trust. It was known as Stanocola until 1924.  In 1944 Standard Oil of Louisiana was absorbed into its parent company.

Defunct oil companies of the United States
Standard Oil
Companies based in Shreveport, Louisiana
American companies established in 1909
Energy companies established in 1909
Non-renewable resource companies established in 1909
Non-renewable resource companies disestablished in 1944
1909 establishments in Louisiana
1940s disestablishments in Louisiana
1944 disestablishments in the United States
Defunct companies based in Louisiana
American companies disestablished in 1944